Bane is a town in Ogoni territory of Rivers State, Nigeria. Located within the Ken-Khana kingdom, Bane was the birthplace of chief Jim Wiwa and forms the immediate eastern coastal boundaries between Rivers State and Akwa Ibom State. The main boundary that demarcates these two States is the Imo River on whose coastlines the town is conspicuously located. Bane's immediate neighbours on the other side of the Imo River are the Opobo and the Nkoro (Rivers State) and the Anaang (Akwa Ibom State).

Geography
Bane covers an area of approximately 10 square kilometres. Its topographical layout stands at about 100 meters above sea level. According to the Ordnance Survey Map of Rivers State (1980), Bane is positioned approximately on Latitude 4° 14 North and Longitude 3° 4 East. Bounded on the north are Eweh and Kwawa; Bere and Duburo on the east; and Buan and Kono to the west with the southern peripheries covered by the Imo River. By the 1973 National population census figures, the population of nine villages of Bane, excluding Kenwigbara, stood at about 8,500; one of the highest in the district.

Governance
Bane Town consists of ten autonomous villages - Bara, Deewii, De, Gbor, Kenwigbara, Laba, Luumene, Mae, Maa-or, and Nyorzorgor; each village under the traditional leadership of a "Mene" (Chief). According to oral tradition, the historical intricacies surrounding the founding of Bane conceded the founding of the town to Gbene-Onye Sasabaa; a traditional honour that conferred on him the royal title of "Tẽ-ere Bue" and "Mene Bue" Bane. By this historical tradition, the Gbene-Onye's Family of Bara is the only family that can produce the paramount king (Mene Bue) for Bane Town.

Language
The spoken language of the Bane people is Khana. However, Baneans speak a distinct aspect of the dialects of the Khana language. This distinct aspect of the Khana language is not only interesting, fascinating, and unique in usage, manner, and style but also stands Baneans out among other Khana language speakers. For example, Baneans use a consistent “I”  - ikpotor (legs), ikpote (stick), ikpobari (piece of fish) as against the other dialectical variations - akpotor, ekpotor (legs), akpote, ekpote (stick), akpobari, ekpobari (piece of fish).

Economy
The location of Bane is significant. The land on which Bane is situated and the surrounding rivers – Imo and Niger – provide food, drinkable water, and other needed natural resources. Bane people practice an agro-based economy. Their traditional occupations are fishing and farming. Baneans specialise in breeding livestock, fishing, and food and cash crop production. They cultivate and grow akpakporo (cassava), zia (yam), adὲ (cocoyam), tuu (three-leave yam), kpaakpaa (maize), nia-ee (fruited pumpkin) amongst others. They also breed pee (goats) and naa-na pee (sheep) naturally, a free-style breeding process that allows goats and sheep to roam and feed on their own in morning and return to their pens in the evening. Fishing is done with gbò (nets), ilo (hooks), and other fishing traps such as gbee, gana, kὲrὲ, and kpor. Basically, they have a fresh-salt water (tormaa-maala) system which makes their fishes salty and very tasty.

Religion
Bane is a secular community governed by both traditional and Christian religious beliefs and nuances. Ancestral and deity shrines (Loò) and churches (Tor-Bari) can be found throughout the community.  The Supreme Being, ancestors, gods, goddesses, land and water in the community are deified especially through yearly festivals such as De Bari (marking first-fruits harvest, dedicated to the Supreme Being), De Dua (New Yam Festival), and Tor-ziá and Christian celebrations like Easter and Christmas.

Cultural festivals
Bane’s yearly festivals are held during yam harvest periods and at the beginning of every farming season. These festivals and celebrations are widely communal and remarkably family reunion moments-oriented. To mark the Dua Festival, yams are harvested and honoured (in form of libations) before powerful deities and in families. Masquerades like Miã, Tὲὲbee, Zim, Waalu, and Ikina, among others, are showcased to mark these events. Aside the Bari, Dua, and Tor-zia festivals, other festivals and celebrations are also held in the community. Some of these festivals and celebrations held to commemorate the founding of the town, to pay homage to a particular ancestral land, or ancestors, gods, goddesses, deities or spirits, or taking of titles and for entertainment.

References

Towns in Rivers State
Populated places in Rivers State